Puisieulx is a commune in the Marne department in north-eastern France.

Champagne
The village's vineyards are located in the Montagne de Reims subregion of Champagne, and are classified as Grand Cru (100%) in the Champagne vineyard classification.

See also
Communes of the Marne department
Classification of Champagne vineyards

References

Communes of Marne (department)
Grand Cru Champagne villages